All-Con is a four-day convention held annually in the Dallas, Texas, area. All-Con provides an umbrella of content supporting fans of science fiction, fantasy, Renaissance, anime, costuming, theater/performing arts, mystery, art, crafts, collecting, and filmmaking. To help give back, there are several charity events at the convention every year. The All-Con motto is "We Serve The Fan Community." Since 2007, the anime programming has been provided by members of Mu Epsilon Kappa's University of North Texas chapter.

Event History

References

External links
All-Con official website

Multigenre conventions
Science fiction conventions in the United States
Festivals in Dallas
Conventions in Texas
Festivals established in 2005
2005 establishments in Texas